José Parlá (born 1973 in Miami, Florida), is a Brooklyn-based contemporary artist whose work has been described as "lying between the boundary of abstraction and calligraphy."

Parlá is publicly known for his permanent installations of large-scale paintings. In 2013 he painted the mural Nature of Language at the James B. Hunt Jr. Library at North Carolina State University, the mural Diary of Brooklyn at the Barclays Center, and a 90-foot mural ONE: Union of the Senses in the lobby of One World Trade Center.

Parlá constructs his paintings improvisationally by layering materials, saying "I’m really interested in the way our lives are built up out of memory and history, and how we reflect that in our surroundings."

Parlá has exhibited worldwide and collaborated with artists from various countries.  In 2012, Jose worked with French artist JR on a piece titled "Wrinkles of the City: Havana", Cuba a project, which in the same year was selected to be in the 11th Havana Biennial.  As part of the collaboration, Parlá and JR co-directed a documentary by the same title that was awarded the Grand Prize for Documentary Short and Best U.S. Premiere Documentary Short in 2013.

Early life
José Parlá was born in Miami to Cuban immigrant parents. At just 10, he began painting art on walls in Miami, often signing his work with his nickname "Ease."  Parlá received a scholarship to Savannah College of Art & Design when he was 16, after a high school teacher noticed his talent. He later studied at Miami Dade Community College and New World School of the Arts.

He moved to the Bronx after his father died to established himself as an artist in New York, initially supporting himself by designing album covers and T-shirts for hip-hop artists such as Gang Starr.

Career
Parlá's heavily layered paintings can often resemble distressed city walls. Writer Greg Tate wrote: "What José Parlá's paintings force us to realize, as good historical paintings always do, is that given enough time and entropy even the hurtling locomotive motion of the streets can be arrested, contemplated, symbolically apprehended, studied, replicated. The temptation to call Parlá a 'post-graffiti’ painter is great but I'd prefer we recognize him as a historical landscape painter even though his historical landscape is made of concrete, wood and wallboard and his 'histories' derive from personal memories and from events buried and embedded in the gorgeous erosions and ruination time and weather will deposit on your average urban walls." Parlá finds old posters from city streets, which he incorporates into his paintings to give a greater sense of place and create the impression of layers of posters papered over each other for generations. He paints over these with thick splashes of colour and abstract calligraphy, weaving lines connecting the works together, similarly to Cy Twombly's paintings from the 1950s. Each work attempts to describe the place where he is working. Exhibitions such as José Parlá: Segmented Realities (2015, High Museum of Art, Atlanta) recreate these walls in three dimension.

Large scale murals

Parla's first large-scale mural was for a Toronto housing development called City Place in 2009.

In 2012 he painted a 70-foot long lobby mural titled Diary of Brooklyn for the Barclays Center, and a lobby painting for the Brooklyn Academy of Music's Fisher Theater. Parla worked on the two painting simultaneously, going back and forth between the two nearby buildings and working late.

The next year he painted the mural The Nature of Language for the newly constructed James B. Hunt Jr. Library at the North Carolina State University.

In 2014 Parlá painted ONE: Union of the Senses which is displayed in the lobby of One World Trade Center. The painting measures 15 ft by 90 ft, and is thought to be the largest painting in New York City.

Career summary
In 2011, Parlá was commissioned to paint two gigantic and highly detailed murals for the Parade1 building at Concord CityPlace in Toronto, Canada. The paintings titled The Names that Live But Sometimes Fade While Time Flies and The Bridge although abstract in nature- are filled with stories of different artists, which Parlá pays homage to through his calligraphic marks and gestures.

In 2012, Parlá was commissioned to create a site specific-piece for the inside of the EmblemHealth Dean entrance at the Barclays Centre. The piece titled, Diary of Brooklyn is inspired by the book Brooklyn Is by James Agee and is visible from the street, creating an interaction with the public.

In 2012, Parlá completed his first large scale commissioned artwork titled Gesture Performing Dance, Dance Performing Gesture. According to Parlá, this 37 feet long by 7 feet tall mural located at The Brooklyn Academy Of Music serves as a "reminder that we are not passive bystanders; we are active participants in a world that our senses produce for us, from moment to moment."

In 2012, Parlá collaborated with French artist JR on a huge mural installation in Havana. The project was undertaken for the Havana Biennale, for which JR and Parlá photographed and recorded 25 senior citizens who had lived through the Cuban revolution.

In 2013, Parlá completed a piece titled Nature of Language at the North Carolina State University's Hunt Library designed by Snøhetta in Raleigh. The artist describes the piece here, "Although illegible at first sight, the juxtaposed characters, gestures, hieroglyphs, and words become readable through feeling, as it is my hope that the work evokes the language of your own inner voice of your own history. I found inspiration in the essence of words and their combined power, however abstract within a landscape of gestural forms and characters that serve as carriers of meaning. Within this meta-landscape, a viewer is welcomed to read into or feel the Nature of this universal language putting grammatical forms on hold."

In 2014, Parlá was commissioned to paint a piece for the One World Trade Centre in New York City. Visitors to the lobby of One World Trade Centre is greeted by Parlá's colorful 90 ft mural titled ONE: Union of the Senses which stands as a symbol of diversity. "The lively, jewel-toned mural will greet an estimated 20,000 visitors a day. I think that the role of the art is to create life within a building, said Mr. Edelman, It's not just about white marble walls, it's about spirit and life." Parla has said that "It was very important to me that this painting would reflect a massive respect to the situation and event and the families, and a massive respect for the site."

In 2014, Parlá exhibited two paintings at the High Museum. One painting which is 40 feet long titled "Night and Day in London Town" poetically evokes time passing over the course of a day in London and incorporates Parlá's calligraphic mark-making. The second painting, titled Hackney Canal, Rio Don Diego 2008  is a large painting inspired by Wifredo Lam's masterpiece "La Jungla," 1943 (collection of the Museum of Modern Art, New York).

In 2015, Parlá showcased his sculptural pieces titled Segmented Realities at the Havana Biennial.

Exhibitions
In 2014, Parlá exhibited his first museum solo show by the title of Segmented Realities at the High Museum of Art Atlanta, followed by the 2015 group exhibition Imagining New Worlds at the High Museum of Art Atlanta alongside Cuban surrealist painter Wifredo Lam and Atlanta based contemporary artist Fahamu Pecou.

In the fall of 2015, Parlá held a concurrent solo exhibition at Mary Boone Gallery and Bryce Wolkowitz Gallery titled Surface Body/ Action Space. This exhibition showcased new paintings and sculptures never before seen.

Parlá's work can also be found in the permanent collections of The British Museum, London; The Albright-Knox Art Gallery, Buffalo, New York, POLA Museum of Art, Hakone, Japan; and The Burger Collection in Hong Kong.

Solo Shows
2020 Gana Art Center, Seoul Korea. Entropies
2020 Yuka Tsuruno Gallery, Tokyo, Japan. The Awakening
2020 Bronx Museum of the Arts, New York City. It's Yours
2019 Bryce Wolkowitz Gallery, NYC, NY. Anonymous Vernacular.
2018 Neuberger Museum of Art Neu Space 42 No Space / Non Place
2017 SCAD Museum of Art, Savannah, Georgia
2017 Brooklyn Academy of Music
2017 Brand New Gallery, Milan, Italy. Mirrors  
2016 YoungArts, Miami, FL. ROOTS.
2016 Michael-Goss Foundation, Dallas, TX. Instincts
2016 Yuka Tsuruno Gallery, Tokyo, JP. Small Golden Suns.
2015 Mary Boone Gallery, NYC, NY. Surface Body.
2015 Bryce Wolkowitz Gallery, NYC, NY. Action Space.
2015 High Museum of Art, Atlanta, Georgia. Segmented Realities.
2014 Bryce Wolkowitz Gallery, NYC, NY. In Medias Res.
2013 Yuka Tsuruno Gallery, Tokyo, Japan. PROSE.
2013 Haunch of Venison, London, England. Broken Language.
2012 Brooklyn Academy of Music, Brooklyn, NY. Gesture Performing Dance, Dance Performing Gesture. 
2011 OHWOW Gallery, Los Angeles, CA. Character Gestures.
2011 Bryce Wolkowitz Gallery, NYC, NY. Walls, Diaries and Paintings.
2009 Ooi Botos Gallery, Hong Kong, China. Reading Through Seeing.
2008 Cristina Grajales, NYC, NY. Layered Days. 
2007 Elms Lesters Painting Rooms, London, England. Adaptation/ Translation.
2007 Autopsy Gallery, Melbourne, Australia. The Grand Tour.
2007 Monster Children Gallery, Sydney, Australia. The Elsewhere Community.
2006 Art Basel Miami Beach, Miami Beach, Florida. Cityscapes.
2006 Koehler Gallery, Whitworth College, Spokane, Washington. The Mystic Writing Pad.
2004 Refill Space Gallery, Redfern, Sydney, Australia.

Group Shows
2014 High Museum of Art, Atlanta, Georgia. Imagining New Worlds, Wifredo Lam, José Parlá, Fahamu Pecou. 
2012 Havana, Cuba. 11th Havana Biennial. Havana, Cuba. Wrinkles of the City. (JR and José Parlá) Martha Otero Gallery, Los Angeles, California. *Legal Tender. 
2010 Art Basel Miami Beach, Miami Beach, Florida. It Ain’t Fair – OHWOW.
2010 Bryce Wolkowitz Gallery, NYC, NY. The New Grand Tour. 
2009 Kidd Yellin Gallery, Brooklyn, New York. The Kings County Biennial. 
2009 Galerie Emmanuel Perrotin, Paris, France. Stages. 
2009 Deitch Projects, NYC, NY. Stages. 
2009 OHWOW Gallery, Miami, Florida. Stages. 
2009 V1 Gallery, Copenhagen, Denmark. The New Yorkers. 
2008 DNA Space, Beijing, China. The New Grand Tour. 
2008 Kai Kai Ki Ki Gallery, Tokyo, Japan. Hi & Lo. 
2007 Elms Lesters Painting Rooms, London, England. Pirate Utopias – Futura and José Parlá. 
2004 Chelsea Art Museum, NYC, NY. Hollywood to the Street: Mimmo Rotella and José Parlá. 
2004 SECCA - Southeastern Center for Contemporary Art, Winston-Salem, North Carolina. The Barnstormers: Retrospective. 
2003 Agnès B. Galerie, Paris, France.

Awards, panels and residencies
2018 Americans for the Arts’ Public Art Network (PAN) Award
2016 Miami Dade College Alumni Hall of Fame Award Inductee
2014 Istanbul74’ Arts & Culture Festival, Istanbul, Turkey; Brooklyn Arts Council honoree, 2014
2014 Caldera Arts at Portland Art Museum, Portland, Oregon
2013 ICA Institute of Contemporary Arts, London
2013 Centro de Arte Contemporáneo, Wifredo Lam - Havana, Cuba Latin American Culture Center – Paris
2013 Grand Prize, Best Documentary Short, Best U.S. Premiere, Heartland Film Festival for Wrinkles of the City, Havana Cuba co-directed with JR
2009 Artist talk, Painting program, Syracuse University, New York
2006 Koehler Gallery, Whitworth College Northwest Museum of Arts & Culture Spokane, Washington

Bibliography

Boatright, Kristen, In the Studio with José Parlá, ARTINFO.COM, 1 October 2014.
Kinberger, Charlotte, José Parlá In the Midst of Things, WHITEWALL, 30 September 2014.
Baumgardner, Julie, Higher Ground, CULTURED MAGAZINE, September 2014.
Binlot, Ann, A Lesson in Cultural Diplomacy, FORBES.COM, 26 June 2014.
Boatright, Kristen, High-Profile Names Help Istanbul Celebrate Arts and Culture, ARTINFO.COM, 19 June 2014.
Staff, Artist José Parlá Opens Up on His Miami, ARTSY.COM, 29 November 2013.
Murphy, Tim, Layering it as it Plays, THE NEW YORK TIMES, 13 June 2013, p. E11.
Roffino, Sara, 29 Questions for Narrative Painter José Parlá, ARTINFO.COM, 13 May 2013.
Barrionuevo, Alexei, Is It Art, or Is It Just Real Estate?, THE NEW YORK TIMES, 11 April 2013, p. RE4.
Wee, Darryl Jingwen, José Parlá's First Solo Show at Yuka Tsuruno, ARTINFO.COM, 5 April 2013.
Paginton, Fred, José Parlá's Broken Language, WHITEWALL, 20 February 2013.
Aguilar, Andrea, El Rey Cubano de Brooklyn, EL PAIS, 416 January 2013.
Cashdan, Marina, Memo From Miami: The Cuban Connection, THE NEW YORK TIMES STYLE BLOG, 7 December 2012.
Cembalest, Robin, Cuban Interest Section, ART NEWS, 5 December 2012.
Cohen, Patricia, New Art for Brooklyn, THE NEW YORK TIMES ARTS BEAT, 20 September 2012.
Parlá, José, Work In Progress, V MAGAZINE, Fall 2012, p. 139.
Vogel, Carol, A Really Big Painting for BAM's New Theater, THE NEW YORK TIMES, 3 August 2012.
Jaffe, Tali, José Parlá's ‘Character Gestures’ Opens at OHWOW in LA, WMAGAZINE.COM, September 2011.
Schiller, Sara, and Jiae Kim, José Parlá's Art Collection THEME MAGAZINE, Issue 23, August 2011.
Laster, Paul, Review: José Parlá, ‘Walls, Diaries & Paintings’, TIME OUT NEW YORK, 4 April 2011.
Binlot, Ann, Asked & Answered: José Parlá, THE NEW YORK TIMES MAGAZINE ONLINE, 18 March 2011.
Daquino, John Everett, The Urban Life Force, ARTSLANT.COM, 13 March 2011.
Balestin, Juliana, José Parlá at Bryce Wolkowitz, PURPLE DIARY (France), 12 March 2011.
Slenske, Michael, Bomb, Memory: Q+A With José Parlá, ART IN AMERICA, 7 March 2011.
Indrisek, Scott, The Writing on the Wall, MODERN PAINTERS, March 2011.
Rabinovitch, Simona, Calligraphic Coding, NUVO MAGAZINE, Spring 2011.
Rabinovitch, Simona, José Parlá Brings Massive Murals to Toronto, THE GLOBE AND MAIL, 17 January 2011.
Pelleteri, Carissa, Featured Artists: José Parlá & Rey Parlá, ARTCARDS.CC, 30 November 2010.
Dauriac, Romain, José Parlá, CLARK MAGAZINE (France), November–December 2010, pp. 28–29.
O’Byrne, Alix, José Parlá, L’OFFICIEL HOMMES (Paris), September 2010, p. 85.
Birchill-White, Alexandra, 2010's Wisest Resolution was to Fly to New York to Meet José Parlá, AIE MAGAZINE (Paris), Summer 2010.
Gleadell, Colin, Arts Market News, TELEGRAPH.CO.UK, December 2009.
Garfield, Joey, José Parlá, JUXTAPOZ MAGAZINE, December 2009, pp. 64–77.
Havis, Richard James, Off the Wall, SOUTH CHINA MORNING POST (Hong Kong), 17 May 2009, p. 10 Arts.
Parlá, Rey, José Parlá and the Bizen Pottery Tradition, THE NEW ORDER, Issue 2, 2009, pp. 124–125.
Bryce, James, José Parlá, THE NEW ORDER, Issue One, 2009, pp. 124–128.
Waltemath, Joan, José Parlá: Layered Days, 
THE BROOKLYN RAIL, December 2008.
Dauriac, Romain, José Parlá: Fragments de Memoires, CLARK MAGAZINE (France), November–December 2008, pp. 34–37.
Parlá, Rey, José Parlá Interview, THE NEW GRAND TOUR MONOGRAPH, 2008.
Gavin, Francesca, State of Decay: José Parlá, DAZED & CONFUSED, 2007, p. 158.

References

External links
 Artist site

References 

American contemporary artists
Living people
1973 births
American people of Cuban descent